The People’s Power party is a former political party in Ukraine registered on September 1, 2004. The party merged into the (then) new party United Left and Peasants in December 2011.

The party never competed in a national election. The party’s aim was to develop democracy and a Ukraine without oligarchs. The last party leader was former transport minister in the second Tymoshenko Government Yosyp Vinsky.

References

External links
Official website
Labour parties
Labour parties in Ukraine
Political parties established in 2004
Political parties disestablished in 2011
Defunct political parties in Ukraine
2004 establishments in Ukraine
2011 disestablishments in Ukraine